The R242 road is a regional road in Ireland. It is a road on the northern Inishowen Peninsula in County Donegal. The R242 is Ireland's northernmost regional road and leads to Malin Head. The road forms part of the Wild Atlantic Way.

The R242 travels north from the R238 at Drumaville to Malin village. From Malin the road travels along Trawbreaga Bay before turning inland and northward. The R242 ends at the coastguard station at Slievebawn, but minor roads continue from here towards Malin Head.

References

Regional roads in the Republic of Ireland
Roads in County Donegal